The fourth election to the Neath Port Talbot County Borough Council was held on 1 May 2008.  It was preceded by the 2004 election and followed by the 2012 election.  On the same day there were elections to the other 21 local authorities in Wales and community councils in Wales.

Overview
All council seats were up for election. These were the fourth elections held following local government reorganisation. Labour retained its majority.

|}

Candidates
The number of candidates increased compared with 1999.

Results

Aberavon (three seats)

Aberdulais (one seat)

Alltwen (one seat)

Baglan (three seats)
Councillors Hopkins and Richards had been elected as Ratepayers in 2004.

Blaengwrach (one seat)

Briton Ferry East (one seat)

Briton Ferry West (one seat)

Bryn and Cwmavon (three seats)

Bryncoch North (one seat)

Bryncoch South (two seats)

Cadoxton (one seat)

Cimla (two seats)

Coedffranc Central (two seats)

Coedffranc North (one seat)

Coedffranc West (one seat)

Crynant (one seat)

Cwmllynfell (one seat)

Cymmer (one seat)

Dyffryn (one seat)

Glyncorrwg  (one seat)

Glynneath (two seats)

Godre'r Graig (one seat)

Gwaun Cae Gurwen (one seat)

Gwynfi (one seat)

Lower Brynamman (one seat)

Margam (one seat)

Neath East (three seats)

Neath North (two seats)

Neath South (two seats)

Onllwyn (one seat)

Pelenna (one seat)

Pontardawe (two seats)

Port Talbot (three seats)

Resolven (one seat)

Rhos (one seat)

Sandfields East (three seats)

Sandfields West (three seats)

Seven Sisters (one seat)

Taibach (two seats)

Tonna (one seat)

Trebanos (one seat)

Ystalyfera (one seat)

References

Neath Port Talbot
2008